Thomas James Peters (12 December 1920 – 2010) was an English professional footballer who played in the Football League for Accrington Stanley, Bury and Mansfield Town.

References

1920 births
2010 deaths
English footballers
Association football forwards
English Football League players
Doncaster Rovers F.C. players
Southend United F.C. players
Bury F.C. players
Leeds United F.C. players
Droylsden F.C. players
Mansfield Town F.C. players
Accrington Stanley F.C. (1891) players
Brighton & Hove Albion F.C. players